Rock pipit may refer to either of two species:

 European rock pipit, Anthus petrosus
 African rock pipit (or yellow-tufted pipit), Anthus crenatus

Animal common name disambiguation pages